Leichardt is a rural locality in the City of Greater Bendigo and the Shire of Loddon. The locality is likely named after Ludwig Leichhardt.

History
in 1874, a school was opened which then closed in 1993.   Throughout most of Leichardt's history, it has been a farming settlement.

References

Bendigo
Suburbs of Bendigo
Towns in Victoria (Australia)